Allen Alexander Bradford (July 23, 1815 – March 12, 1888) was a Delegate from the Territory of Colorado.

Born in Friendship, Maine, Bradford moved to Missouri in 1841. He studied law and was admitted to the bar and practiced. He served as clerk of the circuit court of Atchison County, Missouri from 1845 to 1851. He moved to Iowa and was judge of the sixth judicial district 1852–1855. He then moved to the Territory of Nebraska, where he served as a member of the Territorial house of representatives in 1856, 1857, and 1858.  In 1860, he moved to the Territory of Colorado, and was appointed judge of the supreme court of the Territory by President Abraham Lincoln on June 6, 1862.

Bradford was elected as a Republican to the Thirty-ninth Congress (March 4, 1865 – March 3, 1867). He resumed the practice of law.

Bradford was elected to the Forty-first Congress (March 4, 1869 – March 3, 1871). He engaged in the practice of law in Pueblo, Colorado, until his death there March 12, 1888. He was interred in the City Cemetery.

References

Sources

1815 births
1888 deaths
Delegates to the United States House of Representatives from Colorado Territory
Iowa state court judges
Missouri state court judges
People from Knox County, Maine
Colorado lawyers
Colorado Republicans
Members of the Nebraska Territorial Legislature
19th-century American politicians
19th-century American judges
19th-century American lawyers